Brđani Kosa is a village in Croatia, in the municipality of Sunja, Sisak-Moslavina County. It is connected by the D224 highway.

Demographics
According to the 2011 census, the village of Brđani Kosa has 103 inhabitants. This represents 46.19% of its pre-war population according to the 1991 census. 

The 1991 census recorded that 85.20% (190/223) of the village population were ethnic Serbs, 5.83% were Yugoslavs (13/223), 3.59% were ethnic Croats (8/223) and 5.38% were of other/unknown ethnic origin (12/223).

Notable natives and residents

References

Populated places in Sisak-Moslavina County
Serb communities in Croatia